Thomas Cain (10 November 1892 – September 1975) was an English footballer who played in the Football League for Brentford as a wing half.

Career 
A wing half, Cain began his career at Richmond YMCA before the outbreak of the First World War in 1914. During the war, he guested for Irish club Bohemians. After the war, he played for Queens Park Rangers, Guildford United, Dartford and Sheppey United. Cain joined Third Division South club Brentford in 1924 and made 12 appearances for the struggling team, before departing the following year.

Personal life 
Cain served in the East Surrey Regiment.

Career statistics

References

1892 births
People from the London Borough of Ealing
English footballers
Brentford F.C. players
English Football League players
Bohemian F.C. wartime guest players
Queens Park Rangers F.C. players
Southern Football League players
Association football wing halves
1975 deaths
Guildford City F.C. players
Dartford F.C. players
Sheppey United F.C. players
East Surrey Regiment soldiers
British Army personnel of World War I
Military personnel from London